Chaenactis furcata is a Mexican species of flowering plants in the aster family. It grows on the Baja California Peninsula in northwestern Mexico, the State of Baja California (sometimes erroneously called Baja California Norte).

References

furcata
Flora of Baja California
Plants described in 1940